Daryn Cresswell (born 22 May 1971) is a former Australian rules footballer who played for the Sydney Swans in the Australian Football League, and the former senior coach of the Tasmanian Devils Football Club that played in the Victorian Football League.

Playing career
Cresswell started his football with Glenorchy in the Tasmanian Football League. He also briefly played for Geelong Reserves in the Victorian Football League, Daryn then returned to Tasmania to play with North Hobart in the TFL the following year. Daryn was then drafted to the Sydney Swans in the 1992 mid-season draft.

Cresswell played for the Swans for twelve seasons between 1992 and 2003, playing 244 games, the seventh-most games in Sydney and South Melbourne history. He was a member of the Swans' losing 1996 Grand Final team and was named in both the Swans and Tasmanian Teams of the Century. In 1993, in his second season he won the Swans' most improved award and the following season he was awarded the Bob Skilton Medal as the Swans's best for 1994. In 1997, he dislocated his kneecap while laying a tackle, knocked it back into place immediately and played again the next week. Other notable moments in Cresswell's career include a number of game-winning goals. Particularly, a kick after the siren to score a goal and secure victory for the Sydney Swans over North Melbourne Kangaroos in Round 4 of the 2002 season.

Statistics

|-
|- style="background-color: #EAEAEA"
! scope="row" style="text-align:center" | 1992
|style="text-align:center;"|
| 28 || 8 || 4 || 14 || 100 || 56 || 156 || 23 || 1 || 0.5 || 1.8 || 12.5 || 7.0 || 19.5 || 2.9 || 0.1 || 0
|-
! scope="row" style="text-align:center" | 1993
|style="text-align:center;"|
| 28 || 18 || 29 || 15 || 224 || 83 || 307 || 75 || 18 || 1.6 || 0.8 || 12.4 || 4.6 || 17.1 || 4.2 || 1.0 || 0
|- style="background-color: #EAEAEA"
! scope="row" style="text-align:center" | 1994
|style="text-align:center;"|
| 28 || 21 || 15 || 13 || 275 || 152 || 427 || 84 || 26 || 0.7 || 0.6 || 13.1 || 7.2 || 20.3 || 4.0 || 1.2 || 3
|-
! scope="row" style="text-align:center" | 1995
|style="text-align:center;"|
| 8 || 22 || 17 || 13 || 306 || 201 || 507 || 111 || 24 || 0.8 || 0.6 || 13.9 || 9.1 || 23.0 || 5.0 || 1.1 || 3
|- style="background-color: #EAEAEA"
! scope="row" style="text-align:center" | 1996
|style="text-align:center;"|
| 8 || 24 || 11 || 22 || 363 || 161 || 524 || 106 || 56 || 0.5 || 0.9 || 15.1 || 6.7 || 21.8 || 4.4 || 2.3 || 3
|-
! scope="row" style="text-align:center" | 1997
|style="text-align:center;"|
| 8 || 23 || 16 || 14 || 367 || 244 || 611 || 71 || 32 || 0.7 || 0.6 || 16.0 || 10.6 || 26.6 || 3.1 || 1.4 || 6
|- style="background-color: #EAEAEA"
! scope="row" style="text-align:center" | 1998
|style="text-align:center;"|
| 8 || 24 || 21 || 13 || 375 || 264 || 639 || 85 || 15 || 0.9 || 0.5 || 15.6 || 11.0 || 26.6 || 3.5 || 0.6 || 13
|-
! scope="row" style="text-align:center" | 1999
|style="text-align:center;"|
| 8 || 23 || 18 || 11 || 352 || 284 || 636 || 98 || 26 || 0.8 || 0.5 || 15.3 || 12.3 || 27.7 || 4.3 || 1.1 || 7
|- style="background-color: #EAEAEA"
! scope="row" style="text-align:center" | 2000
|style="text-align:center;"|
| 8 || 22 || 23 || 11 || 364 || 202 || 566 || 108 || 31 || 1.0 || 0.5 || 16.5 || 9.2 || 25.7 || 4.9 || 1.4 || 11
|-
! scope="row" style="text-align:center" | 2001
|style="text-align:center;"|
| 8 || 18 || 16 || 12 || 237 || 115 || 352 || 77 || 31 || 0.9 || 0.7 || 13.2 || 6.4 || 19.6 || 4.3 || 1.7 || 8
|- style="background-color: #EAEAEA"
! scope="row" style="text-align:center" | 2002
|style="text-align:center;"|
| 8 || 22 || 17 || 15 || 277 || 223 || 500 || 81 || 48 || 0.8 || 0.7 || 12.6 || 10.1 || 22.7 || 3.7 || 2.2 || 2
|-
! scope="row" style="text-align:center" | 2003
|style="text-align:center;"|
| 8 || 19 || 21 || 6 || 217 || 159 || 376 || 91 || 31 || 1.1 || 0.3 || 11.4 || 8.4 || 19.8 || 4.8 || 1.6 || 5
|- class="sortbottom"
! colspan=3| Career
! 244
! 208
! 159
! 3457
! 2144
! 5601
! 1010
! 339
! 0.9
! 0.7
! 14.2
! 8.8
! 23.0
! 4.1
! 1.4
! 61
|}

Coaching and post-football life
Following his retirement as a player, Cresswell became an assistant coach—firstly at Geelong and then at Brisbane. He then moved back to Tasmania and coached the Tasmanian Devils in the VFL following the resignation of Matthew Armstrong, where, after a number of poor performances and a scandal involving a six-figure debt he owed to Tassie Mariners coach Andrew Mellor, he fled Tasmania to England for some time. 
Cresswell's brother Shane had coached Ulverstone (NTFL) to the premiership in 2000. In 2009, Cresswell was appointed player-coach of Division One Sydney AFL side the Manly Wolves. Despite a promising start to the season, numerous off-field issues (including being extradited to Queensland for fraud) and player discontent saw Cresswell sacked from the role at season's end.
In April 2009, he was declared bankrupt, owing almost $700,000. He admitted that a gambling addiction had led him to lose everything after he retired from playing football. 2010 saw Cresswell sign with Sydney AFL Premier Division side Western Suburbs, kicking 33 goals in 10 matches. In December 2010, Cresswell was found guilty of fraud offences and sentenced to a minimum 10 months jail. Upon release in October 2011, he appeared on Channel 7's Sunday Night, where he admitted to placing a $200 bet on a match he was playing in back in 2003.

References

External links

Sydney Swans players
1971 births
Living people
Australian rules footballers from Tasmania
Bob Skilton Medal winners
Glenorchy Football Club players
North Hobart Football Club players
All-Australians (AFL)
Tasmanian Football Hall of Fame inductees
Allies State of Origin players